A guard tower is any military tower used for guarding an area. These towers are usually operated by military personnel, and are structures built in areas of established control. These include military bases and cities occupied by military forces. This type of fortification is a variation on the tower incorporated into the walls of castles from history, and are, in the modern day, equipped with such facilities as heavier weapons than those carried by infantry and searchlights.

Notable guard towers
Alcatraz guard towers
Auschwitz II guard towers
Tower of London
Yuma Territorial Prison 1876 guard tower.

Gallery

See also
Guardhouse
Watchtower

References

Towers
Prisons